Frengen Church is a chapel in Indre Fosen municipality in Trøndelag county, Norway. It is located in the village of Frengen on the south shore of the Stjørnfjorden. It is an annex chapel for the Sør-Stjørna parish which is part of the Fosen prosti (deanery) in the Diocese of Nidaros. The white, wooden church was built in a rectangular style in 1972 using plans drawn up by the architect Torgeir Sund. Originally it was the chapel for the cemetery, but it was later expanded and made into a church.  The church seats about 90 people.

See also
List of churches in Nidaros

References

Indre Fosen
Churches in Trøndelag
Rectangular churches in Norway
Wooden churches in Norway
20th-century Church of Norway church buildings
Churches completed in 1972
1972 establishments in Norway